Ganda Singh Wala  (Punjabi/) is a village, just 58 km from Lahore City in Kasur District in the Punjab, Pakistan. Until 1986, it served as the main border crossing between Pakistan and India. The Sutlej River flows by Ganda Singh Wala, and the area is prone to flooding.

The village is now 45 minutes drive from Lahore after the construction of new Lahore-Firozpur road. Nearby Burj Naamdaar village is noted for the cultivation of bamboo.

Etymology

The village was named after Ganda Singh Datt. It lies on the border with Eastern Punjab, India. The Pakistani village, which was named after a Sikh man, lies opposite the Indian village of Hussainiwala, which in turn was named after a Muslim man.

India Pakistan Border

Border crossing 
The border crossing is now closed. In the 1960s and 1970s, it was the principal road crossing between India and Pakistan, but was replaced by the border crossing at Wagah, a little further north. In 2005 there were proposals to reopen the border, but it remained closed. More recently the Chief Minister of Punjab Shahbaz Sharif proposed the reopening of the border when he visited Attari in India.

Border ceremony 
Since 1970 a daily 6 pm Beating Retreat Border Ceremony is jointly held at the border crossing by military of both nations. It similar to the Attari-Wagah border ceremony. Attendees are seated close by, as compared to Wagah where crowds are kept far apart. Unlike the jingoistic display at Wagah which draws nationalistic tourists from all over India and Pakistan, the Hussainiwala ceremony is more intimate and attended mostly by local Punjabis on either side of the border. As a result, the atmosphere is not as tense, and Indian and Pakistani attendees often smile and wave to one another.

See also 
 Attari-Wagah border crossing
 Hussainiwala-Ganda Singh Wala border crossing

References

External links 
 Ceremony at the Ganda Singh Wala India-Pakistan border

Populated places in Kasur District
India–Pakistan border crossings